Trestle Glen is a neighborhood in Oakland, California. It is located east of Lakeshore Avenue, a shopping street which it shares with the Grand Lake District. It lies at an elevation of 144 feet (44 m).  The streets are laid out in the curvilinear pattern of early 20th century garden suburbs.  Many of the houses are nestled in the surrounding hills, and were built shortly before The Great Depression. The neighborhood is named after a railroad trestle built in 1893, which was dismantled in 1906 when the line was rerouted. The railroad line ran along Trestle Glen Creek, which was named Indian Gulch by early settlers after the Huchiun village that was located near the present-day intersection of Lakeshore Avenue and Trestle Glen Road. (The creek is now mostly underground.) The streetcar was instrumental in spurring the development of residential neighborhoods in the area. It is often written that Mark Twain was a passenger on the maiden voyage of the streetcar, though Twain lived in Europe at the time.

References

Neighborhoods in Oakland, California
Streetcar suburbs